Maksim Vitalyevich Ishkeldin (22 June 1990 – 5 June 2021) was a Russian professional bandy player. He played for the Yenisey Krasnoyarsk Bandy Club from 2020, and previously for the Novosibirsk Sibselmash (2006–2010) and the Krasnogorsk Zorky (2010–2015) and the SKA-Neftyanik (2015–2020) and was part of the Russia national bandy team in world championship competitions. After the 2017–18 season he was elected the best player in the Russian Super League, as well as after the 2018–19 season.

On 23 April 2020, Yenisey Krasnoyarsk Bandy Club presented Ishkeldin as their newest player.

Death
Ishkeldin died of a blood clot in his sleep on 5 June 2021.

References

External links
 
 

1990 births
2021 deaths
Sportspeople from Novosibirsk
Russian bandy players
Sibselmash players
Zorky Krasnogorsk players
SKA-Neftyanik players
Bandy World Championship-winning players
Yenisey Krasnoyarsk players